Michel Ngue-Awane is a British- Cameroonian author, businessman and artist. He is a local authority commissioning, procurement and contract management professional. He is the author of 'Above Colonial Subconscious Africa Moves'  and 'Poor Land or Poor Minds'
 
Michel was born on 1 February 1975 in the city of Ouagadougou from parents of Cameroon origin. 
From 1999 to 2001 he was the Youth Advisor for the United Nations Environment Programme and organised the Global Youth Campaign on sustainable consumption. As UNEP youth advisor, he also contributed to 'Pachamama Missao Terra 2'   a children book published by Peace Child International  in Collaboration with the United Nations Environment Programme.

In 2009, he self- published a book titled, Practice Guide to Social Housing, which was used as course book for his housing training programmes in the United Kingdom. This book was well received by housing professionals and hundreds of people without prior experience in Social Housing used it as study guide to get jobs in Local Governments and Housing Associations. The book was rated very good by both professionals and all trainees and many still use it today as professional guide for their work.

Between 2006 and 2008, Michel was an advisory Committee member for the Mayor of London Refugees and Migrant Advisory Panel, shaping the Mayor of London policies on Migrants' integration  and a subgroup Member for the Home Office Refugee Forum, advising the Home Office on employment and housing strategies for Refugees and Migrants in the United Kingdom.

In 2010, Michel was one of the 10 contenders  for the first Local Government Challenge. Michel has won various awards for his community work in UK including the UNLTD and the Millennium Award  with a lifetime fellowship. In 2014 he was nominated as one of the best businessman within the Cameroonian community in UK  and in 2015 he was also nominated as the best Cameroonian author of the year.
Michel is a businessman and has created his own brand of Chilli Sauce called PEP Chilli Sauce which is sold in shops across the United Kingdom and France.   Michel is a fluent French and English speaker but writes his books in English.

His theory of the colonial subconscious
Michel Ngue-Awane argues that although African countries won the physical battle against the colonial powers’ occupation, they are still struggling to liberate their minds. A history of subtle and systematic indoctrination of their subconscious, through programmes put in place to control them, left its shadow, with African people unable to take action to change their status quo. A history of tales has fooled Africans to believe their situation could change simply by the wave of a magic wand.
 
‘The Colonial Subconscious’ -a theory that many of the current struggles faced by Africans people are exacerbated unconsciously by themselves, due to their lack of actions to change systems that were put in place to control them. By keeping and working with these systems, they perpetuate their self-annihilation, living as dependants individuals under siege- and encourages readers to reflect on their own lives and sense of self. By identifying these repressed ideologies the individual can confront the negative shackles and enter a positive stage of self-actualisation. This releases the subconscious and invites in new experiences and opportunities leaving the individual able to take firm, positive action and full control over their destiny. Only after individuals in Africa have improved and honoured themselves, can they collectively rise above all prejudices and stereotypes ensuring freedom, peace and prosperity for future generations.

Views on education

Michel Ngue-Awane thinks that education plays a key role in the fabric of the society and argues that individuals will never discover their true purpose in life if they fail to understand their inner self. Education should therefore help individuals to know who they truly are so that they can pursuit their own agenda in life, but when they fail to understand this, they end up studying and living other people’s life.
 
He conclude that Africa cannot change or develop if their respective governments don’t change their current education system. The current education system in every African country is not relevant to their situation, context and needs, therefore not suitable for Africans.  Africans according to Michel Ngue-Awane will remain servants, living on "borrowed-self" as long as they continue with the colonial education system. True education should be geared toward identifying one’s potentials and needs, and developing programmes that will help to meet those needs. He believe that Africa can lead the world if Africans discover their true identity and follow it.

View on poverty
For Michel Ngue-Awane, poverty is a mental state and yet again, he suggests that a poor person, in reality, doesn't want to be poor, however, he has programmed his subconscious mind to accept poverty as a situation that cannot be defeated Until he breaks this mental barrier, he will never defeat poverty. He thinks that most African people are poor because they are still mentally and psychologically bound, having been trained to accept poverty as normal, see and consider themselves as poor people. This situation is exacerbated and maintained by aid programmes. Accepting and living on aid is yet another mechanism to perpetuate poverty. that makes life easier and comfortable, however, poor people’s subconscious mind accepts it. They attribute the causes of poverty to someone else but themselves.

He asserts that there is never a lack of opportunities. There are always possibilities and opportunities for one who spares no effort to look for them. These opportunities are never discovered from outside of self. To find opportunities, we need to be tuned in to the source.
Every man's work is a signature of his life. What you do determines who you are and where you are going. What you do determines what you are known for, and what your family will become known for. Thoughts of greatness create a state of greatness. Achieving greatness without great ideas is difficult. People with a will to succeed, cultivate these thoughts and never give up because they know that they are destined to succeed. Like our ancestors, each of us has a choice as to whether to brave challenges by forcing his way through the winding slopes of life or to give up and resign to fate. Despite having been given a blank cheque at birth, some people are not able to write it to themselves. This is common in parts of the world where poverty and hunger affect millions of people.

Unconsciously, we are deciding on what we should be. Unconsciously, we are creating our condition. Our mind is like a camera. What we focus on will appear. What we let sink into our subconscious will appear outwardly and define our physical appearance and behaviour

View on Democracy and Development 
A country cannot claim to be developed when it is unable to feed its population. In Africa, there is almost everything African people need to meet their needs. Rivers and streams abound, but Africans still depend on the mercy of rain for their subsistence farming.  Without a clear road map for their development, Africa will never move an inch.

For Michel Ngue-Awane, state of development is where citizens can have a share in the nation’s wealth, and where they can easily meet their needs for food, shelter, health, production and reproduction without a lot of difficulties. True development is when citizens can easily have the means to buy or access experiences they desire. For example, with money, they can buy the experiences of good food, good holiday, good hospital treatment, decent accommodation etc.

These experiences do not necessarily require an elected government or regular change in governments to be expressed. In fact some changes in government can hinder these experiences and limit people’s possibilities to thrive. What people really want is the type of governments that encourage creativity, investment, freedom of undertakings, freedom of entrepreneurship, and freedom of ambitions, whether it is an elected government or not. Africans should therefore adopt the type of government that is suitable for their respective nations, instead of  importing concepts that make no difference to their citizens’ lives.

Our mind-set determines our conditions and this is why Michel argues that we can change governments every year, but without a change of mind-set, Africa will remain poor and under-developed.

He conclude that a government is as rich as its citizens  and if the citizens are poor, the country will be poor.

View on world resources 
Resources abound in the world and many are those not yet discovered, when their needs will arise, new discoveries will be made. Those who argue that the world will run out of resources are wrong. As long as human beings remain on earth, there will always find new ways to meet their needs.

History tells us that when one resource is used up, new ones are discovered to meet the needs of its time and  new ones will be found when there is a pressing need to be met. The world is rich; yesterday we used coal, which was as precious as gold. Today we turn the sun into electricity, and our black gold has become a liability called  unclean energy. Tomorrow new methods and resources will be discovered and used, as our needs for those resources arise.

Quotes from his book
“The Neolithic man did not live or rely on international aid.”

“We need to help people to acquire the ability to think positively, to think of possibilities and to self-value. We need to train them to think in terms of what they want to be and of possibilities”

“We create our conditions by our thoughts process and we can only change them through our thoughts process.”

“Impossibility is a self-imposed limitation”

“A government is as rich as its people because it makes money from citizens and if citizens are poor, the country will be poor”.

“Resources abound in the world and many are those not yet discovered, when their needs arise, we will discover them”.
"Anyone can seek opportunities. However, to find them, you need to know what you are looking for."

"Poverty has never been ordained, neither by nature nor God. Nature is incredibly rich, and God is unlimited. All there is, seen or unseen, imagined or not yet, already is in God. Man chooses to live in poverty in exchange for an easy ride, as opposed to giving what it takes to get what he is destined for."
"Living in poverty is giving up the race in exchange for a little now, irrespective of the consequences. No one will ever reach their purpose without postponing the current gratification for the ultimate prize. Reaching your purpose may require more readiness, more serving, more training, more studying, more sacrifice and giving up the ease of now to achieve something greater." 
"Poverty is an unwise choice for an unwise man. It is the end destination for a fool and a state of mind of a lost sheep."

"Creative ability rests in the mind. Creativity defines and determines one’s environment and experience in life. But what one is used to exerts a significant influence in his life, which is inevitably transformed and depends on such exposure. Therefore, to awaken our genius, we need always to contemplate great things, think high and be influenced by great ideas and acquire such habits ourselves."

https://www.amazon.co.uk/Poor-Land-Minds-Africa-Respond/dp/0995727600/ref=tmm_pap_swatch_0?_encoding=UTF8&qid=&sr=== References ==

Amazon (paperback) - https://www.amazon.co.uk/Poor-Land-Minds-Africa-Respond/dp/0995727600/
Amazon (ebook) - https://www.amazon.co.uk/Poor-Land-Minds-Africa-Respond-ebook/dp/B07BDJ3BWW/
Smashwords (ebook) - https://www.smashwords.com/books/view/802610
Barnes & Noble (ebook) - https://www.barnesandnoble.com/w/poor-land-or-poor-minds-michel-ngue-awane/1128190391?ean=2940155173700
Kobo (ebook) - https://www.kobo.com/gb/en/ebook/poor-land-or-poor-minds
Apple iTunes (ebook) - https://geo.itunes.apple.com/gb/book/poor-land-or-poor-minds/id1359557807?mt=11

Cameroonian writers
1975 births
Living people
Black British television personalities
British Christians
Cameroonian emigrants to England